The men's 800 metres event at the 2017 European Athletics Indoor Championships was held on 3 March 2017 at 11:35 (heats), on 4 March at 19:25 (semifinals) and on 5 March 17:50 (final) local time.

Medalists

Records

Results

Heats
Qualification: First 2 in each heat (Q) and the next 4 fastest (q) advance to the Semifinal.

Semifinals

Qualification: First 3 in each heat (Q) advance to the Final.

Final

References

2017 European Athletics Indoor Championships
800 metres at the European Athletics Indoor Championships